Ledecký (feminine Ledecká) is a Czech surname. Notable people with the surname include:

 Dagmar Ledecká (1925–2021), Czech ballerina
 Daniela Ledecká, Slovak hurdler
 David Ledecký (born 1993), Czech footballer
 Ester Ledecká (born 1995), Czech skier and snowboarder
 Janek Ledecký (born 1962), Czech musician
 Jon Ledecky (born 1958), American businessman
 Katie Ledecky (born 1997), American swimmer

See also

 

Czech-language surnames